A hypothetical military victory of the Axis powers over the Allies of World War II (1939–1945) is a common topic in speculative literature. Works of alternative history (fiction) and of counterfactual history (non-fiction) include stories, novels, and plays that often explore speculative public and private life in lands conquered by the coalition, whose principal powers were Nazi Germany, Imperial Japan, and Fascist Italy.

The first work to inspire the genre was Swastika Night (1937), by Katherine Burdekin, a British novel published before Nazi Germany launched the Second World War in 1939. Later novels of alternative history include The Man in the High Castle (1962) by Philip K. Dick, SS-GB (1978) by Len Deighton, and Fatherland (1992) by Robert Harris. The stories deal with the politics, culture, and personalities who would have allowed the fascist victories against democracy and with the psychology of daily life in totalitarian societies. The novels present stories of how ordinary citizens would have dealt with fascist military occupation and with the resentments of being under colonial domination.

The literature uses the Latin term Pax Germanica to describe such fictional post-war outcomes. The term Pax Germanica was applied to the hypothetical Imperial German victory in the First World War (1914–1918), which usage derives from the term Peace of Westphalia used in the Latin-language documents that formally ended the Thirty Years' War (1618–1648).

Academics such as Gavriel David Rosenfeld in The World Hitler Never Made: Alternate History and the Memory of Nazism (2005), have researched the media representations of 'Nazi victory'.

Depictions of the Axis Powers

Themes
Helen White stated that a hypothetical world in which Nazi Germany won the Second World War is a harsher and grimmer place to live in than the real world, where Nazi Germany and the Axis Powers lost the War in 1945. Speculative literature about hypothetical military victories by the Axis Powers have generally been English-language literary work from the British Commonwealth and the United States as such protagonists tend to experience events from the perspective of military defeat and foreign military occupation. 

The literary tone of alternative history fiction presents the military victory of the Axis Powers as a melancholy background against which the reader sees the unfolding of political plots in a socially strained atmosphere of foreign occupation and socio-economic domination.

The Ultimate Solution (1973), by Eric Norden, shows the Nazified people and the society of the United States as a morally hopeless nation and state; a state of affairs that concludes with a nuclear war between Nazi Germany and Imperial Japan. The social story of SS-GB (1978), by Len Deighton, concludes with a US commando raid into Nazi occupied Great Britain, to rescue British nuclear scientists, while the British Resistance remains hopeful of eventual military liberation by the United States. In Clash of Eagles (1990), by Leo Rutman, the people of New York City rebel against the Nazi occupation of the US. In Fatherland (1992), by Robert Harris, the story concludes with the protagonists exposing the Holocaust to the American people, thereby thwarting Hitler's rapprochement with the US, meant to solve the continual economic crises of the Greater German Reich. Harry Turtledove's In the Presence of Mine Enemies (2003) presents the Nazi world two generations after their victory in WWII, in a time and place that allowed political liberalization and democratization.

Early depictions
The novel Swastika Night (1937) presents the post-war world born from the victory of the Axis Powers: A dictatorship characterized by much "violence and mindlessness" which are justified by "irrationality and superstition". Published two years before Nazi Germany began the Second World War in 1939, Swastika Night is a work of future history and not a work of alternative history. The book reviewer, Darragh McManus, said that although the story and plot of the novel are “a huge leap of imagination, Swastika Night posits a terrifyingly coherent and plausible [world]”, that “considering when it was published, and how little of what we know of the Nazi regime today was then understood, the novel is eerily prophetic and perceptive about the nature of Nazism”.

The short story, I, James Blunt (1941), is a work of wartime propaganda set in a fictional September 1944 when Great Britain is under Nazi rule. The story is told through the entries of a diary, which describe the social and economic consequences of military occupation such as British workers sent to the shipyards of Nazi Germany and Scotland to build warships to attack the U.S. The novel concludes with the diarist exhorting the reader to ensure that the story of the Nazi occupation of Great Britain remains fiction.

The novel We, Adolf I (1945) presents a Nazi victory in the Battle of Stalingrad (August 23,1942 – February 2,1943) which allowed Hitler to crown himself emperor of the world. In Berlin, the Nazis build an imperial palace featuring architectural elements of the Eiffel Tower and the Statue of Liberty. In the course of the story, the despot Hitler enters a dynastic marriage with the Japanese Imperial princess in an effort to produce a Fascist heir to rule the world after Hitler.

The Last Jew: A Novel (Ha-Yehudi Ha'Aharon, 1946) tells the future history of a Nazi world ruled by the League of Dictators, wherein the last Jew to survive the Final Solution is discovered hiding in Madagascar. The League of Dictators plan the public execution of the last Jew as entertainment during the Olympic Games. Before they can realize the spectacular death of the last Jew, the Moon's excessive proximity to Earth, a negative consequence of Nazi lunar colonization, provokes a catastrophe that extinguishes life on planet Earth. The novel should not be confused with Yoram Kaniuk's novel The Last Jew, which has been translated to English.

The stage play Peace in Our Time (1947) explores the nature of fascist rule in London and examines the deleterious effects of military occupation upon the mental health of the common man and the common woman. As a playwright, Coward was included in the Gestapo's Black Book of enemies-of-the-state to be arrested upon completion of Operation Sea Lion, the Nazi conquest of Great Britain.

The novel The Man in the High Castle (1962) presents an Axis victory after Franklin D. Roosevelt is assassinated in 1933 and the United States is divided between Nazi Germany and Imperial Japan.

Later depictions
Additional notable depictions of Axis victory include:

Literature

 The Sound of His Horn by Sarban (1952)
 "Living Space" by Isaac Asimov (1956)
 The Big Time by Fritz Leiber (1957)
 The Man in the High Castle by Philip K. Dick (1962)
 The Iron Dream by Norman Spinrad (1972) depicts a science fiction/fantasy allegory of a Nazi victory
 The Ultimate Solution by Eric Norden (1973)
 SS-GB by Len Deighton (1978)
 The Divide by William Overgard (1980)
 The Proteus Operation by James P. Hogan (1985)
 Thor Meets Captain America by David Brin (1986)
 Moon Of Ice by Brad Linaweaver (1988)
 The Last Article by Harry Turtledove (1988)
 Clash of Eagles by Leo Rutman (1990)
 And All the King's Men by Gordon Stevens (1991)
 Timewyrm: Exodus (Doctor Who novel) by Terrance Dicks (1991)
 Fatherland, by Robert Harris (1992)
 No Retreat by John Bowen (1994)
 '48 by James Herbert (1996)
 Attentatet i Pålsjö skog by Hans Alfredson (1996)
 Making History by Stephen Fry (1996)
 Patton's Spaceship by John Barnes (part of  The Timeline Wars series (1997))
 Against the Day by Michael Cronin (1999)
 After Dachau by Daniel Quinn (2001)
 Collaborator by Murray Davies (2003)
 In the Presence of Mine Enemies by Harry Turtledove (2003, the first 21 pages were originally a short story published in 1992)
 The Leader by Guy Walters
 Mobius Dick by Andrew Crumey (2004)
 The Plot Against America by Philip Roth (2004)
 Warlords of Utopia by Lance Parkin (2004)
 Farthing, Ha'penny, and Half a Crown, series by Jo Walton (2006–2008)
 Resistance by Owen Sheers (2007)
 The Conquistador's Hat by John Maddox Roberts (2011)
 Dominion by C. J. Sansom (2012)
 A Kill in the Morning by Graeme Shimmin (2014)
 The Madagaskar Plan by Guy Saville (2015)
 Mecha Samurai Empire series by Peter Tieryas (2016–2020)

Counterfactual scenarios are also written as a form of academic paper rather than necessarily as fiction and/or novel-length fiction:
 What If?: The World's Foremost Military Historians Imagine What Might Have Been contains "How Hitler Could Have Won the War" by John Keegan.
 Virtual History: Alternatives and Counterfactuals, edited by Niall Ferguson, contains "Hitler's England: What if Germany had invaded Britain in May 1940?" by Andrew Roberts and Niall Ferguson, plus "Nazi Europe: What if Nazi Germany had defeated the Soviet Union?" by Michael Burleigh.

In the All About History Bookazine series, What if...Book of Alternate History (2019): Among the articles are What if...Germany had won the Battle of Britain? and What if...The Allies had lost the Battle of the Atlantic?

Film
 It Happened Here (1966), a British film directed by Kevin Brownlow
 Philadelphia Experiment II (1993)
 Fatherland (1994), based on the 1992 novel
 Jackboots on Whitehall (2010)
 Resistance (2011)

Television
 The Other Man (1964)
 Star Trek: The Original Series: "The City on the Edge of Forever" (1967)
 An Englishman's Castle (1978)
 Darkroom: "Stay Tuned, We'll Be Right Back" (1981)
 Justice League: "The Savage Time" (2002)
 Star Trek: Enterprise: "Zero Hour"/"Storm Front" (2004)
 Misfits: Season 3, Episode 4 (2011)
 Danger 5:, Season 2, Episode 7 "Welcome to Hitlerland" (2015)
 The Man in the High Castle (2015–2019), an Amazon Studios series based on the 1962 novel
 SS-GB (2017), a BBC miniseries based on the 1978 novel
 "Crisis on Earth-X" (2017), four-part Arrowverse crossover event between Supergirl, Arrow, The Flash, and Legends of Tomorrow
 The Plot Against America (2020), an HBO miniseries based on 2004 novel

Comics
 "Blitzkrieg 1972", issue 155 of The Incredible Hulk (September 1972), takes place in a battle-torn New York City, where German Nazi forces, from their headquarters on Wall Street, are increasingly defeating the outnumbered US Army forces desperately defending the city—until the Hulk comes to take a hand in the fighting and confront the super-Nazi Captain Axis.
 In DC Comics, Earth X is an alternative Earth in which the Nazis won World War II.
 In the 2003–2004 Captain America story arc Cap Lives (Captain America Vol. 4, issues 17-20), Captain America awakens from suspended animation in 1964 to find that—due to a temporal anomaly—Nazi Germany has won WWII and conquered much of the world, including the United States. After dropping a nuclear bomb on the US, Nazi Germany took control of North America, renaming New York City as "New Berlin" and declaring it the capital of Nazi America. The Red Skull has become the Führer of the so-called "New Reich" and seeks to create an army of blonde, Aryan supermen or super soldiers based on Captain America's DNA. Alongside American resistance fighters that include Bucky Barnes, Nick Fury and his Howling Commandos, Peter Parker, Ben Grimm, Johnny Storm, Sue Storm, Reed Richards, Hank Pym, Janet van Dyne, Tony Stark, Donald Blake, Bruce Banner, Matt Murdock, Luke Cage, Frank Castle, and Stephen Strange, Captain America fights against the New Reich and succeeds in returning to the timeline in which he is originally meant to be.
 An alternate reality (designated as Earth 9907) in which the Red Skull survived and assumed leadership of the failing Third Reich, leading it into total world domination, also appears in the A-Next comic series by Marvel Comics.

Video games
 Rocket Ranger (as a background story/alternate reality) by Cinemaware (1988)
 Battlestations: Pacific by Eidos Interactive (2009)
 Wolfenstein: The New Order by MachineGames (2014)
 Wolfenstein: The Old Blood by MachineGames (2015)
 Wolfenstein II: The New Colossus by MachineGames (2017)
 Wolfenstein: Youngblood by MachineGames (2019)
 Among the many alternate history timelines featured in the GURPS role-playing game Infinite Worlds is the highly dangerous timeline known as Reich-5, the worst of several Nazi-victorious alternate histories.

See also

 American Civil War alternate histories
 If Day
 Kantokuen
 Operation Sea Lion in fiction
 Proposed Japanese invasion of Australia during World War II
 Palestine Final Fortress (possible Nazi occupation of Palestine)
 Axis powers negotiations on the division of Asia
 Ural Mountains in Nazi planning
 Generalplan Ost
 Axis Powers

References

Further reading
 Rosenfeld, Gavriel David. The World Hitler Never Made. Alternate History and the Memory of Nazism (2005).
 Tighe, C., "Pax Germanica in the future-historical" in Amsterdamer Beiträge zur neueren Germanistik, pp. 451–467.
 Tighe, Carl. "Pax Germanicus in the future-historical". In Travellers in Time and Space: The German Historical Novel (2001).
 Winthrop-Young, Geoffrey. "The Third Reich in Alternate History: Aspects of a Genre-Specific Depiction of Nazism". In Journal of Popular Culture, vol. 39 no. 5 (October 2006).
 Klaus-Michael Mallmann and Martin Cüppers. Nazi Palestine. The Plans for the Extermination of the Jews in Palestine, New York: Enigma Books with the United States Holocaust Memorial Museum, 2010.
 
Dystopian fiction
Political fiction
 
Axis powers